The Travis Perkins Masters is a men's professional golf tournament for players aged 50 and above which is part of the European Senior Tour. It was founded in 2001 and is played on the Duke's course at Woburn Golf and Country Club near Milton Keynes, England.

Winners

External links
Coverage on the European Senior Tour's official site

European Senior Tour events
Golf tournaments in England
Sport in Milton Keynes
Recurring sporting events established in 2001
2001 establishments in England